Chryseobacterium viscerum  is a Gram-negative and rod-shaped bacteria from the genus of Chryseobacterium which has been isolated from the gills and livers from rainbow trouts.

References

Further reading

External links
Type strain of Chryseobacterium viscerum at BacDive -  the Bacterial Diversity Metadatabase

viscerum
Bacteria described in 2012